The 2014–15 Missouri Mavericks season is the 6th season of the ECHL franchise in Independence, Missouri, a suburb of Kansas City, Missouri.

Off-season

On May 21, 2014, Head Coach Scott Hillman announced his resignation from the Mavericks because he is "pursuing other hockey opportunities and wants to move to a community where he and wife Dalyn's sons can compete at the highest level."  On May 27, 2014, Hillman was named as the first Head Coach for the expansion Indy Fuel of the ECHL.

On June 12, 2014 Richard Matvichuk, a 14-year veteran Defenseman in the National Hockey League, was announced as the new Head Coach for the Mavericks.  Matvichuk had spent the previous two seasons as the Assistant General Manager and Defensive Assistant for the Allen Americans, also of the Central Hockey League, during which time the team won two consecutive Ray Miron President's Cup league championships.

On June 26, 2014, the Mavericks renewed their affiliation agreement for the 2014-15 season with the Chicago Wolves of the American Hockey League.

Between July 1 and July 11, 2014, Mavericks fans voted for the Top-10 Mavericks players from the first 5 years of the team's existence.  Beginning on July 15, 2014, The Examiner newspaper revealed the players one-per-day.

On October 7, 2014, soon before the 2014–15 Central Hockey League season was set to begin, it was announced that the Central Hockey League ceased operations and the Mavericks, along with the Allen Americans, Brampton Beast, Quad City Mallards, Rapid City Rush, Tulsa Oilers, and Wichita Thunder, were all admitted to the ECHL for the 2014–15 ECHL season.  All Central Hockey League contracts which had already been signed by players for the 2014-15 Central Hockey League season were immediately nullified, which forced the team to hastily attempt to re-sign as many players as possible to ECHL contracts.  For the 2014-15 ECHL season, the Mavericks were designated to play in the Midwest Division of the Western Conference in the ECHL.

In February 2015, Lamar Hunt Jr., son of former Kansas City Chiefs owner Lamar Hunt, purchased the Mavericks outright from majority owner Matt Adams, partners Mark Adams and Mike Carper, and General Manager Brent Thiessen, who had a minority stake in the organization.  Hunt Jr. will own the team through his company Loretto Sports Ventures, LLC.

Regular season

Awards, records, and milestones

Transactions

Player signings and acquisitions off of waivers

Free agency loses, player releases, and player retirements

Trades

Transfers and on loan players

Player suspensions or placed on leave

Injured reserve

Roster

As of April 12, 2015

See also
 2014–15 ECHL season

References

External links
 Missouri Mavericks Official Website 
 2014–15 Missouri Mavericks season at EliteProspects.com
 2014–15 Missouri Mavericks season at ECHL.com

Missouri Mavericks seasons
Missouri
Missouri
2014 in sports in Missouri
2015 in sports in Missouri